Keith Micah de Luna Tan also known as Mike Tan or Atorni Mike is a Filipino politician and lawyer. He is a member of the Philippine House of Representataives from Quezon's 4th District since June 30, 2022. He succeeded his mother Angelina Tan, who is the incumbent Governor of Quezon.

References 

Living people

Year of birth missing (living people)
Members of the House of Representatives of the Philippines from Quezon
Politicians from Quezon
Nationalist People's Coalition politicians